Ts'A-Le-Moleka is a community council located in the Butha-Buthe District of Lesotho. Its population in 2006 was 18,737.

Villages
The community of Ts'A Le Moleka includes the villages of Ha Biafa, Ha Fako, Ha Komoho, Ha Lekanyane, Ha Letsika, Ha Makhoahla, Ha Makhotla, Ha Makuini, Ha Malefane, Ha Maleholo, Ha Malofo, Ha Manamela, Ha Masek'hou, Ha Matjeka, Ha Mohlanka, Ha Mokhatla (Manamela), Ha Molibeli (Manamela), Ha Moshoeshoe (Kololong), Ha Motabola, Ha Motinyane (Qalo), Ha Motjanyela, Ha Motsoari (Qalo), Ha Mpaki, Ha Ntsoana (Serutle), Ha Pokane, Ha Qophela, Ha Sebophe, Ha Selomo, Khilibitling, Kotsonkoaneng, Liforong (Ha Leboea), Likhahleng, Liphakoeng, Maholong, Majakaneng, Makong, Malimong (Ha Leboea), Maloseng, Mamphaneng, Manamela, Mantlakane, Mantloaneng, Marabeng, Masite, Matsatsaneng, Mothae, Qalo, Rolosela, Sebothoane (Serutle), Sekoting, Sekubu Mission, Seliba-Setšo (Manamela), Sephokong, Taung, Tebe-Tebe (Serutle), Thajaneng and Tikathole (Ha Leboea).

Sekubu Mission was founded in 1877 by Francis Richard Townley Balfour.

References

External links
 Google map of community villages

Populated places in Butha-Buthe District